Marie Askehave (born 21 November 1973) is a Danish actress and singer. 
She was born in Nibe, graduated from Statens Teaterskole in 2003, and since 8 July 2006 has been married to colleague David Owe. They have two daughters.

Askehave has had many roles in TV and film productions and is probably best known for her 2007 role as Rie Skovgaard, in The Killing.

In March 2007, she released her first music album with the title Detour.

Askehave is a member of Denmark's Socialist People's Party.

Filmography

Film

Television

External links

Footnotes 

Danish television actresses
Living people
1973 births
People from Nibe
21st-century Danish  women singers